Seckach is a village and a municipality in the district of Neckar-Odenwald-Kreis, in Baden-Württemberg, Germany. The river Seckach passes through it.

Twin towns
  Gazzada Schianno, Italy

References

Neckar-Odenwald-Kreis